The 17th Hollywood Film Awards were held from October 18 to 20, 2013. The ceremony took place at The Beverly Hilton Hotel in Santa Monica, California.

Winners
 Hollywood Career Achievement Award: Harrison Ford
 Hollywood Legend Award: Jerry Weintraub
 Hollywood Actor Award: Matthew McConaughey – Dallas Buyers Club
 Hollywood Actress Award: Sandra Bullock – Gravity
 Hollywood Supporting Actor Award: Jake Gyllenhaal – Prisoners
 Hollywood Supporting Actress Award: Julia Roberts – August: Osage County
 Hollywood Breakout Performance Award: Jared Leto – Dallas Buyers Club
 New Hollywood Award: Lupita Nyong'o – 12 Years a Slave
 Spotlight Award: Michael B. Jordan – Fruitvale Station, Sophie Nélisse – The Book Thief, David Oyelowo – The Butler
 Hollywood Breakout Director Award: Steve McQueen
 Hollywood Director Award: Lee Daniels – The Butler
 Hollywood International Film Award: Paolo Sorrentino – The Great Beauty
 Hollywood Producer Award: Michael De Luca – Captain Phillips
 Hollywood Independent Film Award: Paolo Sorrentino – The Great Beauty
 Hollywood Screenwriter Award: Julie Delpy, Ethan Hawke, and Richard Linklater – Before Midnight
 Hollywood New Screenplay Award: Paolo Sorrentino and Umberto Contarello – The Great Beauty
 Hollywood Visual Effects Award: John Knoll – Pacific Rim
 Hollywood Animation Award: Dan Scanlon – Monsters University
 Hollywood Ensemble Award: Meryl Streep, Julia Roberts, Ewan McGregor, Abigail Breslin, Chris Cooper, Benedict Cumberbatch, Juliette Lewis, Margo Martindale, Dermot Mulroney, Julianne Nicholson, Sam Shepard, and Misty Upham – August: Osage County
 Hollywood Song Award: Coldplay – "Atlas" from The Hunger Games: Catching Fire
 Hollywood Costume and Production Design Award: Michael Wilkinson and Judy Becker – American Hustle
 Hollywood Film Award: Star Trek Into Darkness – J. J. Abrams

References

External links
 

Hollywood
2013 in California
Hollywood Film Awards
2013 in American cinema